Tiny Vipers (born 1983) is the stage name of Jesy Fortino, an American musician from Seattle, Washington.

Life on Earth was released on July 7, 2009 on Sub Pop. Luckyhorse Industries released a limited edition 180 gram double vinyl on November 16, 2009, which included a bonus track "Audrey's Well".

On January 20, 2012, it was announced that Fortino would be releasing a collaborative album with Grouper under the name Mirrorring entitled Foreign Body on March 19, 2012.

Laughter was released on May 5, 2017 on Ba Da Bing Records while Fortino was studying to become an engineer.

Solo discography 
 Tiny Vipers (EP, 2004. reissued October 2007 on Luckyhorse Industries)
 Hands Across the Void (LP, July 2007 on Sub Pop)
 Empire Prism (EP, 2007. Reissued July 2008 on Luckyhorse Industries)
 Life on Earth (LP, July 2009 on Sub Pop)
 Weak Moments of the Shadows (EP, 2009)
 Ambience3 (instrumental, ambient music - released in June 2015 on Box Bedroom Rebels)
 Laughter (EP, 2017)
 American Prayer (EP, 2022)

Mirrorring discography
 Foreign Body (with Grouper) (LP, March 2012 on Kranky)

Compilations
 Burn To Shine (DVD, November 2007)
 Contributed song "Another's Day Son" with Colin Roper for the compilation 2021: An Aviation Records Compilation (LP, 2007)

Guest appearances
 Vocal samples and guitar on Orcas' self-titled album (LP, 2012)
 Vocals on "New Dawn Fades" by The Sight Below (Single, 2010)
 Backing vocals on All is Wild, All is Silent'', Balmorhea (LP, 2009)

References

External links
Tiny Vipers at Sub Pop Records
Tiny Vipers on Myspace
Tiny Vipers at Luckyhorse Industries
Tiny Vipers at Bandcamp
 An Interview with Jesy Fortino
 Acoustic Session for 'They Shoot Music – Don't They', March 2010
 Live à Rouen for Europe and co, Rouen (France) March, 5th 2010
 Acoustic Session for Europe and co, March 2010

1983 births
Living people
Sub Pop artists
Musicians from Seattle
21st-century American singers
Singer-songwriters from Washington (state)